HMS Culloden was a 74-gun third-rate ship of the line of the Royal Navy, built according to the dimensions laid out by the 1741 proposals of the 1719 Establishment at Deptford Dockyard, and launched on 9 September 1747. She was the first ship to bear the name, and was named for the Battle of Culloden, which had been fought the previous year.

Construction
Culloden was the first British 74-gun ship built since  in 1668. Her dimensions matched those of an Establishment 80-gun ship, but she was pierced with more gunports on her gundecks. She was also the smallest 74 of the eighteenth century, and was not considered a particularly successful ship by those who served in her.

Navy service

Culloden saw active service during the Seven Years' War, including as part of Britain's ongoing blockade of the French port of Toulon in 1759. On 7 June 1759 she was sent close to the port as part of an attempt to burn two French ships that had taken shelter there. The attack was unsuccessful and Culloden was reported to be "most shattered" by French gunfire.

She was finally sold on 29 June 1770, after 23 years in service.

Notes

References
 
 Lavery, Brian (2003) The Ship of the Line – Volume 1: The development of the battlefleet 1650–1850. Conway Maritime Press. .

 

Ships of the line of the Royal Navy
1747 ships